Kosmos 99 ( meaning Cosmos 99) or Zenit-2 No.32 was a Soviet, first generation, low resolution, optical film-return reconnaissance satellite launched in 1965.

Kosmos 99 was launched by a Vostok-2 rocket, serial number U15001-04, flying from Site 31/6 at the Baikonur Cosmodrome. The launch took place at 08:09 GMT on 10 December 1965. Following its successful arrival in orbit the spacecraft received its Kosmos designation; along with the International Designator 1965-103A and the Satellite Catalog Number 01817.

On 18 December 1965, after eight days in orbit, the satellite was deorbited with its return capsule descending by parachute for recovery by the Soviet force.

References

Kosmos satellites
Spacecraft launched in 1965
Spacecraft which reentered in 1965
Zenit-2 satellites